The 2019 Nicholls State Colonels football team represented Nicholls State University as a member of the Southland Conference during the 2019 NCAA Division I FCS football season. Led by fifth-year head coach Tim Rebowe, the Colonels compiled an overall record of 9–5 with a mark of 7–2 in conference play, sharing the Southland title with Central Arkansas. Nicholls State received the Southland's automatic bid to the NCAA Division I Football Championship, beating North Dakota in the first round before losing to the evenutal national champion, North Dakota State, in the second round. The team played home games at John L. Guidry Stadium in Thibodaux, Louisiana.

Previous season
The Colones finished the 2018 season with a 9–4 overall record, and a 7–2 record in Southland play to win a share of the Southland Conference championship. They received the Southland's automatic bid to the FCS Playoffs where they defeated San Diego in the first round, before losing in the second round to Eastern Washington.

Preseason

Preseason poll
The Southland Conference released their preseason poll on July 18, 2019. The Colonels were picked to finish in first place.

Preseason All–Southland Teams
The Colonels placed eleven players on the preseason all–Southland teams.

Offense

1st team

Chase Fourcade – QB

Dai'Jean Dixon – WR

P.J. Burkhalter – OL

Winston Jones – P

2nd team

Dontrell Taylor – RB

Jair Joseph – OL

Defense

1st team

Sully Laiche – DL

Evan Veron – LB

Allen Pittman – LB

Darren Evans – DB

2nd team

Khristian Mims – DB

Roster

Schedule

Game summaries

at Kansas State

Kansas State scored touchdowns on their first four possessions and were successful 10 of 12 attempts on third down in 80 offensive plays.  Kansas State also managed the clock, being on offense for more than 41 minutes.  For Nicholls, this was largely different compared to last year's opener when they defeated the Kansas Jayhawks.  The Colonel's Kendall Bussey and Julien Gums both produced second-half touchdown runs to put their team on the board, but it wasn't nearly enough. Despite the loss, Nicholls managed to move up in the FCS coaches poll, going from #11 to #10.  They also jumped two spots to #10 in the FCS STATS Poll.

at Prairie View A&M

at Stephen F. Austin

at Texas State

Central Arkansas

Northwestern State

at Sam Houston State

Abilene Christian

at Incarnate Word

Houston Baptist

McNeese State

at Southeastern Louisiana

North Dakota—NCAA Division I First Round
The Colonels received an automatic bid (due to winning their conference) for the postseason tournament, with a first-round pairing against North Dakota.

at North Dakota State—NCAA Division I Second Round

Ranking movements

References

Nicholls
Nicholls Colonels football seasons
Southland Conference football champion seasons
Nicholls
Nicholls Colonels football